St Austell with Fowey (pronounced "foy") was a municipal borough in Cornwall, United Kingdom.  It was created in 1968 by a merger of the historic borough of Fowey and the much more populous St Austell urban district. 

In 1974 St Austell with Fowey was merged under the Local Government Act 1972 into the new Restormel district, becoming an unparished area until 1979. In 1979 Fowey became a civil parish.

In April 2009 four new parishes were formed to create St Austell town council, St Austell Bay civil parish, Carlyon civil parish and Pentewan Valley civil parish.

Civil parishes
The civil parishes within the district were:
 Carlyon
 Fowey
 Mevagissey
 Pentewan Valley
 St Austell
 St Austell Bay
 St Blaise
 Treverbyn
 Tywardreath and Par

References

Districts of England abolished by the Local Government Act 1972
History of Cornwall
Municipal boroughs of England
Local government in Cornwall
Municipal Borough
Fowey